KXDocker is a program for the Linux operating system created by Ing. Stefano Zingarini. It resembles the "Dock" of Mac OS X in that it is mainly used as an application launcher. It supports themes, plugins and a few extra features (there is documentation on creating your own themes). Other such docks available for Linux and KDE include Kiba-dock (implements physics simulation allowing the application icons to be dragged around and initially looked to be more suitable for the GNOME desktop environment), Kooldock and Ksmoothdock. While Kiba-dock is popular for its tag-along with 3D window managers (i.e. AIGLX with Beryl), KXDocker seems to be the choice for those who seek "simple yet powerful" alternatives.

KXDocker was made for Linux distributions using KDE. However, KXDocker also works with GNOME, as outlined by the author. It is free software released under the terms of the GNU General Public License.

According to the project's website, KXDocker is, or soon will be, discontinued, giving way to its successor - "XQDE". However, it seems currently there is not much stated in the XQDE project page (aside from a few insights) and thus we can assume it is still in its infancy. It will be built upon Qt 4 and the author writes "it will gain all Compiz (Beryl) power", which may mean it will have better integration with the compositing window manager.

References
 Aleksey 'LXj' Alekseyev (January 4, 2007) KXDocker: More than a task manager, linux.com
  Wolfgang Miedl (10 January 2005), Linux-Startleiste im Apple-Stil (Linux taskbar in Apple style), Computerwoche
 Marcel Gagné (January 5, 2005) Cooking with Linux - Eye-Popping Panels, Linux Journal

External links

 
 
 XQDE - Successor to KXDocker

KDE software
Application launchers
Linux windowing system-related software